Omari Sheldon Allen (born 19 July 1990) is a West Indian cricketer. Allen is a right-handed batsman who bowls right-arm off break. He was born at Montserrat.

In 2006, Montserrat were invited to take part in the 2006 Stanford 20/20, whose matches held official Twenty20 status. Allen made a single appearance for Montserrat in their first-round match against Guyana, with their first-class opponents winning the match by 8 wickets. He wasn't required to bat in Montserrat's total of 115/8, while during Guyana's innings he wasn't called upon to bowl. As of 2009, he was playing minor matches for Montserrat.

References

External links
Omari Allen at ESPNcricinfo
Omari Allen at CricketArchive

1990 births
Living people
Montserratian cricketers